Terry Thomas (August 20, 1953 – October 26, 1998) was an American National Basketball Association (NBA) player. At 6'8" and 220 lbs, he played as a forward. He was born in Michigan in 1953, graduated from Hazel Park High School, and went to the University of Detroit Mercy. He was drafted by the Detroit Pistons in the 1975 NBA Draft and played one season with them, averaging 2.8 points per game. Thomas died in 1998.

External links

College stats @ sports-reference.com

1953 births
1998 deaths
American men's basketball players
Basketball players from Detroit
Detroit Pistons draft picks
Detroit Pistons players
Detroit Mercy Titans men's basketball players
Power forwards (basketball)